In Dubious Battle is a 2016 drama film directed and produced by James Franco, loosely based on John Steinbeck's 1936 novel of the same name, with a screenplay by Matt Rager. The film features an ensemble cast, consisting of Franco, Nat Wolff, Josh Hutcherson, Vincent D'Onofrio, Robert Duvall, Selena Gomez, Keegan Allen and Ed Harris. The film had its world premiere at the Venice Film Festival on September 3, 2016.

Plot
In Dubious Battle is the story of the working class during the Great Depression, striking against an increasingly cruel establishment in ways that would lead to the formation of workers' rights, including a minimum wage. Two men form a union of workers after their wages are cut from $3 a day to $1 a day."

Cast

Production

Casting
On January 30, 2015, it was announced that James Franco would not only direct the film but star in it too. Also cast was Vincent D'Onofrio, Robert Duvall, Ed Harris, Bryan Cranston, Selena Gomez, and Danny McBride has joined the production.

On March 16, 2015, Nat Wolff was cast in the lead role of Jim Nolan, the organizer of the strike by apple pickers in California. In the next two days, Josh Hutcherson, Zach Braff, Analeigh Tipton, John Savage, Ashley Greene, and Ahna O'Reilly would join the currently film production. Several days later on March 24, 2015, it was announced that Scott Haze has been cast as Frank.

Filming
Principal photography began on March 19, 2015 in Atlanta including Southeastern Railway Museum in Duluth, Georgia, filming also took place in Bostwick, Georgia, and Cowiche, Washington. Production on the film ended in September 2015.

Music
The concluding credits are accompanied by a 78 rpm recording of Pete Seeger's classic union song, "Which Side Are You On?.

Release
In Dubious Battle had its world premiere at the Venice Film Festival on September 3, 2016. The film was released in theaters in the United States on February 17, 2017.

Marketing
A full trailer was released on January 28, 2017.

Reception

Critical response
Review aggregator Rotten Tomatoes gives the film a 30% approval rating, based on reviews from 23 critics, with an average score of 5.1/10.

The film gained mixed reviews at its world premiere, with Owen Gleiberman of Variety noting that Franco "has acquired skills that are beginning to fuse with the best of his instincts." Gleiberman also says that "In Dubious Battle isn't a totally clear-cut good movie, but it's a scrupulous and watchable one. And it makes me think, for the first time, that James Franco has a good movie in him."

Boyd van Hoeij of The Hollywood Reporter simply called the film and Franco as "uneven" but also states that "if In Dubious Battle remains watchable, it's because Wolff really sells his character's doubts, growth and sobering reality checks".

References

External links
 

2016 films
2016 romantic drama films
American romantic drama films
Films based on works by John Steinbeck
Films set in 1933
Films shot in Georgia (U.S. state)
Films shot in Washington (state)
Films set in California
Films based on American novels
Films directed by James Franco
Films about the labor movement
2010s English-language films
2010s American films